Suradet Piniwat (born 4 March 1999), nicknamed Bas, is a Thai actor and singer. He came to prominence from the role of Wayo in the Thai BL drama 2Moons: The Series (2017). He is currently a singer in the Thai boy band, SBFIVE.

Early life and education
Suradet was born on 4 March 1999 in Chiang Mai, Thailand. He has a younger sister named Praepailin Piniwat, who was a trainee in BNK48. He currently studies GED (General Educational Development) at a university.

Filmography

Film

Television Series

Musical

Discography

Singles

SBFIVE

BKC

Collaborations

MV

Endorsements 
 ACNOC
 VOOV Thailand
 AIS One-2-Call ZEED SIM
 Taokaenoi
 Government Savings Bank (GSB) 
 BKC Plus
 Star girl
 Halls Chews
 Arabus
 Viva Plus
 Magnolia Milky

Awards and nominations

References

External links

1999 births
Living people
Suradet Piniwat
Suradet Piniwat
Suradet Piniwat
Suradet Piniwat
Suradet Piniwat